James Hemsley is the founder of the EVA Conferences on Electronic Imaging & the Visual Arts.

Hemsley was educated as a mathematician at the University of Oxford and undertook his PhD at Imperial College, London in England. More recently he has dedicated himself to electronically mediated culture. The first EVA Conference was held at Imperial College, London in 1990 and many EVA Conferences have been held around the world, including continuing conferences in London on an annual basis. He founded VASARI UK Limited in 1993 as a result of the European ESPRIT VASARI Project, which he project managed, aimed at digitizing paintings at very high quality. He was also project director of the EC-supported EVA Networking EVAN projects. Among his posts, he has worked for the National Museums of Scotland.

Hemsley lives in central London.

References

External links

 
 
 EVA Conferences International website
 Photograph from EVA Russia

1941 births
Living people
Writers from London
Alumni of the University of Oxford
Alumni of Imperial College London
Alumni of Birkbeck, University of London
British book editors
British businesspeople
English male writers